Wright Inlet is an ice-filled inlet receding westward between Cape Little and Cape Wheeler along the east coast of Palmer Land. The inlet was photographed from the air in 1940 by the United States Antarctic Service (USAS) and in 1947 by the Ronne Antarctic Research Expedition (RARE) under Ronne. Named by Ronne for John K. Wright, Director of the American Geographical Society, which lent its auspices to Ronne's expedition.

See also 
Piggott Peninsula

References

Inlets of Palmer Land